Hahnenkamm (means "comb") may refer to

Hahnenkamm (Verwaltungsgemeinschaft), a federation of municipalities in Bavaria, Germany
Hahnenkamm, Greenland, a mountain in the Stauning Alps, Greenland
Hahnenkamm, Kitzbühel, a mountain in Tyrol, Austria
Hahnenkamm, Reutte, another mountain in Tyrol, Austria
Hahnenkamm, Spessart, a mountain in the Spessart, Germany